"Life Goes On" is a song by American singer LeAnn Rimes, released as a single from her fifth studio album, Twisted Angel (2002), on August 5, 2002. A song about moving on and letting go of the past, "Life Goes On," missed the US Billboard Hot 100, peaking at number 10 on Billboards Bubbling Under Hot 100 chart. It was a bigger hit outside America, peaking within the top 10 in Australia, Canada, the Netherlands, New Zealand, Romania, and Sweden while reaching the top 20 in Norway and the United Kingdom.

The music video was shot in New Orleans and received criticism because of Rimes' sexual clothing and moves. Fans were also against the song because it had a pop sound instead of the country music Rimes used to record. A country remix of the song was released to country radio and peaked at number 60 on Billboards Hot Country Singles & Tracks chart.

Track listings

UK CD1
 "Life Goes On" (original mix) – 3:35
 "Life Goes On" (Amato and Sheremet mix) – 6:21
 "Life Goes On" (video) – 3:35

UK CD2
 "Life Goes On" (M*A*S*H mix) – 8:04
 "Life Goes On" (Almighty mix) – 3:50
 "Life Goes On" (29 Palms mix) – 7:23

UK cassette single and European CD single
 "Life Goes On" (original version) – 3:35
 "Life Goes On" (Almighty mix) – 3:50

German limited-edition CD single
 "Life Goes On" (original version) – 3:35
 "Can't Fight the Moonlight" (Latino mix) – 3:36

Australian and New Zealand CD single
 "Life Goes On" – 3:33
 "Life Goes On" (Almighty mix) – 3:50
 "Life Goes On" (Amato and Sheremet mix) – 6:21
 "Life Goes On" (29 Palms mix) – 7:23

Credits and personnel
Credits are taken from the Twisted Angel booklet.

Studios
 Recorded at various studios in the United States and United Kingdom
 Mixed at Larrabee West (Hollywood, California) and Larrabee North (Universal City, California)
 Lead vocals mixed at Larrabee North (Universal City, California)
 Mastered at Bernie Grundman Mastering (Hollywood, California)

Personnel

 LeAnn Rimes – writing, vocals, background vocals
 Desmond Child – writing, production
 Andreas Carlsson – writing
 Sherree Ford – background vocals, background vocals arrangement
 Nora Payne – background vocals
 Michael Landau – guitar
 Abe Laboriel Sr. – bass
 Abe Laboriel Jr. – drums
 Peter Amato – keyboards, production, arrangement, programming
 Gregg Pagani – keyboards, production, arrangement, programming
 Rob Chiarelli – mixing
 Bernie Grundman – mastering

Charts and certifications

Weekly charts

Year-end charts

Certifications

Release history

References

External links
 "Life Goes On" official music video at official site.

2002 singles
2002 songs
Curb Records singles
LeAnn Rimes songs
London Records singles
Songs written by Andreas Carlsson
Songs written by Desmond Child
Songs written by LeAnn Rimes